Zuula was a metasearch engine that provides search results from a number of different search engines.  Zuula can be used to carry out standard web searches, image searches, video searches, news searches, blog searches, and job searches.  Results are available from major search engines, such as Google, Yahoo, and Bing, and smaller engines, such as Gigablast and Mojeek.

Metasearch
Zuula does not combine the results from its source search engines.  Instead, tabs are used to organize the results from source engines.  When a user carries out a search, the first results that are displayed are those from the search engine assigned to the first tab.  The user can then click on other tabs to see the results from other source engines.  Users can change the order of the tabs for each search type by moving them into the desired order.

See also
Metasearch engine
List of search engines

External links
Zuula homepage
Review at Search Engine Land
Review at Softpedia

Further reading
 Rouba, Kelly, "Variety sparks search engine growth." The Star-Ledger 13 Feb. 2007.

Internet search engines
Defunct websites